Benaravan (also Romanized as Benāravān; also known as Banāowrān) is a village in Kandovan Rural District, Kandovan District, Meyaneh County, East Azerbaijan Province, Iran. At the 2006 census, its population was 287, in 70 families.

References 

Populated places in Meyaneh County